Gyöngyi Szalay-Horváth (24 March 1968 – 30 December 2017) was a Hungarian fencer. She won a bronze medal in the women's individual épée event at the 1996 Summer Olympics.

References

External links
 

1968 births
2017 deaths
Hungarian female épée fencers
Olympic fencers of Hungary
Fencers at the 1996 Summer Olympics
Fencers at the 2000 Summer Olympics
Olympic bronze medalists for Hungary
Olympic medalists in fencing
People from Tapolca
Medalists at the 1996 Summer Olympics
Sportspeople from Veszprém County